Thandiswa Nyameka Mazwai (born 31 March 1976) is a South African musician, and is also the lead vocalist and songwriter of Bongo Maffin. She is also known as King Tha. Her debut album Zabalaza (2004), which attained double platinum status and her  album also got nominated for Planet Awards on BBC Radio 3.

Same year In 2004, she won Best Female Artist at Metro FM Awards. Her second album, titled "Ibokwe" was produced in 2009, was certified gold status within a few weeks after its release.

Early life
Thandiswa Mazwai was born in Eastern Cape in 1976 – the year of the Soweto Uprising – and grew up almost entirely in Soweto, Johannesburg, amidst the heavy apartheid township violence of the 1980s. Both her parents, Belede and Thami Mazwai, were journalists and anti-apartheid political activists, and she recollects that her home was filled with books, articles and thick with political discussions. It was this environment that nurtured her perspective as an artist. She went on to attend Wits University, where she studied English Literature and International Relations. Her work has always been inspired by her mother (who died when Thandiswa was 15 years old) and the writings of people such as Steve Biko and Frantz Fanon, Chinua Achebe and Kwame Nkrumah.

Family 
She is a sister to Nomsa Mazwai, with whom they have a healthy sibling rivalry. She also goes by the name Thandiswa Mazwai Belede, in honour of her mother Belede, who died at the age of 34 in 1992. She is also a sister to the poet Ntsiki Mazwai, who is an author, social activist, producer, and blogger.

Career

Jack-Knife

Thandiswa was a member of Jack-Knife, with Kimon Webster and Themba Smuts. The trio was regarded as pioneers of the kwaito movement, and their songs like "Fester" and "Chommie" were club hits.

Early years and Bongo Maffin
Thandiswa's first attempt to get noticed occurred at the Shell Road to Fame talent show but Thandiswa did not even make it to the semi-finals round. She did, however, catch the eye of musician and producer Don Laka, who arranged to include her in a project he was working on. She also began her career in 1998 with Bongo Maffin, one of the pioneering bands of Kwaito. She became widely recognised as the voice of South Africa's conscious youth, their compositions consistently combining dance floor favourites with thought-provoking lyrics. They were invited to perform all over the world, and shared the stage with musical icons Stevie Wonder, the Marley clan, Ladysmith Black Mambazo, Chaka Khan, Sean Paul, Steel Pulse and Skunk Anansie, among others. Their contribution to the South African musical cannon earned Bongo Maffin numerous awards, among them the South African Music Awards, the Kora All Africa Music Awards, and the Metro FM Music Awards.

Going solo: Thandiswa
After five albums with Bongo Maffin, Thandiswa ventured onto a solo career. Her first project, Zabalaza (2004), reached double platinum status and won numerous awards, including a Kora award for Best African Female and four South African Music Awards, including Best Album. It was also nominated for the BBC Radio 3 Planet awards. Her second album, Ibokwe (2009), reached gold status in the first few weeks of its release and her live DVD, Dance of the Forgotten Free (2010), won Best Female Artist and Best Live DVD in 2011. The Guardian has called her "South Africa's finest female contemporary singer."

Her music is often deeply political and her compositions include traditional Xhosa rhythms, Mbaqanga, reggae, kwaito and funk and jazz sounds.

Thandiswa has performed all over the world at venues, including at the 2010 FIFA World Cup Opening Ceremony, The Apollo in New York, WOMEX, the Cannes Film Festival, Midem, the Hackney Empire, Africa Brazil Festival, FESPACO Film Festival, BBC World Music Awards and many Mandela 46664 concerts. She has several noteworthy collaborations. For instance, she collaborated on two songs with US musician Meshell Ndegeocello on her album The World Has Made Me the Man of My Dreams, which was nominated for a Grammy in 2007. At home in South Africa, Thandiswa has collaborated with illustrious musicians including Hugh Masekela, Stimela, the late Busi Mhlongo. Together with the rock band BLK JKS, Thandiswa performed as 'King Tha' vs. BLK JKS at the 2017 Afropunk Festival Johannesburg.

In July 2012 she duetted with Paul Simon in Hyde Park, London, in his Graceland album's 25th anniversary concert. She sang the female vocals on "Under African Skies", which was originally sung by Linda Ronstadt on the Graceland album.

She is an ambassador for 46664 and an ambassador for the Eastern Cape Province, South Africa.

In early May 2022, Mazwai was featured by Spotify on Freedom Sounds: From Kwaito to Amapiano documentary.

Discography

 Belede (2016) - Universal Music Group
 Dance of the Forgotten Free (2010) – Live CD: Gallo Records
 Ibokwe (2009): Gallo Records
 Zabalaza (2004): Gallo Records

Bongo Maffin

 From Bongo With Love (2019): Universal Music Group
 New Construction (2005): Gallo Records – Gold Sales
 Bongolution (2001): Sony BMG – Double Platinum Sales
 The Concerto (1998): Sony BMG – Multi Platinum Sales
 Final Entry (1997): EMI
 Leaders of D’Gong (1996): EMI

Awards and nominations

Thandiswa

Bongo Maffin

|-
| 1999
| The Concerto
| South African Music Awards: Best African Pop Album
| 
|-
| 2001
| 
| Kora Africa Music Awards: Best African Group
| 
|-
|rowspan="3"| 2002
| rowspan="3"|Bongolution
| Metro FM Awards: Best African Pop
| 
|-
| Metro FM Awards: Best Duo/Group
| 
|-
| South African Music Award: Best Duo/Group
| 
|-
| rowspan="3"|2006
| rowspan="3"|New Construction
| South African Music Award: Best Duo/Group
| 
|-
| Kora Africa Music Awards: Best African Group
| 
|-
| BBC World Music Awards: Best African Album
| 
|}

References

External links 

"Mazwai, Thandiswa (South Africa)", music.org.za
The 18th Annual MTN SA Music Awards, Sun City, 29 & 30 April 2012.
Official website
Myspace website

21st-century South African women singers
South African singer-songwriters
Xhosa people
1976 births
Living people